The 2010 NCAA Division II women's basketball tournament was the 29th annual tournament hosted by the NCAA to determine the national champion of Division II women's  collegiate basketball in the United States.

Emporia State defeated Fort Lewis in the championship game, 65–53, to claim the Lady Hornets' first NCAA Division II national title.

The championship rounds were contested at the St. Joseph Civic Arena in St. Joseph, Missouri.

Regionals

Atlantic - California and Erie, Pennsylvania

^ California, Pennsylvania Location: Hamer Hall Host: California University of Pennsylvania

~ Erie, Pennsylvania Location: Hammermill Center Host: Gannon University

Southeast - Greenwood, South Carolina
Location: Horne Arena Host: Lander University

South Central - Canyon, Texas
Location: First United Bank Center Host: West Texas A&M University

Midwest - Houghton, Michigan
Location: SDC Gymnasium Host: Michigan Technological University

East - Fitchburg, Massachusetts
Location: Fitchburg State Recreation Center Host: Franklin Pierce College

South - Russellville, Arkansas
Location: Tucker Coliseum Host: Arkansas Tech University

Central - Durango, Colorado
Location: Whalen Gymnasium Host: Fort Lewis College

West - Seattle, Washington
Location: Royal Brougham Pavilion Host: Seattle Pacific University

Elite Eight - St. Joseph, Missouri
Location: St. Joseph Civic Arena Host: Missouri Western State University

All-tournament team
 Alli Volkens, Emporia State
 Cassondra Boston, Emporia State
 Brittney Miller, Emporia State
 Laura Haugen, Fort Lewis
 Allison Rosel, Fort Lewis

See also
 2010 NCAA Division I women's basketball tournament
 2010 NCAA Division III women's basketball tournament
 2010 NAIA Division I women's basketball tournament
 2010 NAIA Division II women's basketball tournament
 2010 NCAA Division II men's basketball tournament

References
 2010 NCAA Division II women's basketball tournament jonfmorse.com

 
NCAA Division II women's basketball tournament
2010 in Missouri